The SDA Tennis Open is a tennis tournament held in Bercuit, Belgium since 2012. The event is part of the ATP Challenger Tour and is played on clay courts.

Past finals

Singles

Doubles

References

External links
Official Website

 
ATP Challenger Tour
Tennis tournaments in Belgium
Clay court tennis tournaments
Grez-Doiceau